Rabindranath Mukherjee also known as R.N Mukherjee  (born on April 19, 1953 at Tribeni, Hooghly; West Bengal, India) is an Indian chemistry professor who is an elected fellow of the Indian National Science Academy. Currently he was Director of Indian Institute of Science Education and Research, Kolkata.

Education

Mukherjee holds an M.Sc. (Specialization in Inorganic Chemistry)  from The University of Burdwan (1976), West Bengal, India obtained his PhD  from The Rajabazar Science College, University of Calcutta (1983) working in the laboratory of Prof. Animesh Chakravorty, the then Head, Department of Inorganic Chemistry, Indian Association for the Cultivation of Science (IACS), Calcutta (now Kolkata).  After spending two years in the same laboratory as a post-doctoral research associate he joined the research group of Prof. R. H. Holm, Department of Chemistry, Harvard University, USA during May 1985-September 1987.

Academic background
He became a member of the faculty as an assistant professor at the Department of Chemistry, Indian Institute of Technology Kanpur, Kanpur, India in October 1987.  Since December 1995 he is a Professor of Chemistry. He was Head of Department of Chemistry, Indian Institute of Technology Kanpur, Kanpur, India.

Positions
 Post-doctoral Research Associate, Indian Association for the Cultivation of Science (in the laboratory of Professor Animesh Chakravorty), IACS, Calcutta (1983 - 1985)
 Post-doctoral Research Associate (in the laboratory of Professor Richard H. Holm), Harvard University, USA (1985 - 1987)
 Assistant Professor, Department of Chemistry IIT Kanpur (1987 - 1993)
 Associate Professor, Department of Chemistry, IIT Kanpur (1993 - 1995)
 Professor, Department of Chemistry, IIT Kanpur (1995–; on deputation from 01/02/2012 to 31/01/2017)
 Head, Department of Chemistry, IIT Kanpur (2010 - )
 Chair Professor, IIT Kanpur (Poonam and Prabhu Goel Chair) (2011 - 2014)

Awards and honors
 Chair Professor at Indian Institute of Technology Kanpur, (Poonam and Prabhu Goel Chair) (2011-2014)
 Priyadaranjan Ray Memorial Award, Indian Chemical Society, Kolkata (2010)
 J. C. Bose Fellowship, Department of Science & Technology, Government of India (2008-2013)
 Elected Fellow of Indian National Science Academy, New Delhi, India (2008)
 Fellow, Indian Academy of Sciences, Bangalore (1999)
 Silver Medal, Chemical Research Society of India, Bangalore, Bangalore (2011)
 Vice President, Chemical Research Society of India (2008- )
 Member, Advisory Board of Dalton Transactions (RSC) (2008-2011)
 Member, Editorial Board of Inorganica Chimica Acta (Elsevier) (2011-2013)

References

1953 births
People from Hooghly district
Educators from West Bengal
Living people
Scientists from Kolkata